Aakrosh is a 1980 Indian Hindi language legal drama film directed by Govind Nihalani in his debut and written by Vijay Tendulkar. Aakrosh starring Naseeruddin Shah, Om Puri and Amrish Puri in pivotal roles, was released to widely positive reviews; winning the Golden Peacock (Best Film) at the 8th International Film Festival of India, as well as the National Film Award for Best Feature Film in Hindi and several other honors.

Aakrosh was a debut film of Nihalani, who went on to be known for his dark and frighteningly real depictions of human angst in other landmark alternative movies such as Ardh Satya and Tamas. It is listed among the 60 films that shaped the Indian film industry spanning six decades.

Plot
Allegedly based on a true incident reported on page 7 of a local newspaper, the film was a scathing satire on the corruption in the judicial system and the victimization of the underprivileged by the able and the powerful.

Aakrosh forms a part of the series of works, based around explorations in violence, written by noted playwright Vijay Tendulkar, who had earlier written Shyam Benegal's Nishant (1974) and went on to write Govind Nihalani's next surprise breakaway hit, Ardh Satya (1983).

Here the victim is shown so traumatized by excessive oppression and violation of his humanity, that he does not utter a single word almost for the length of the film and only bears a stunned look, though later he uses the same violence as a tool to express his own sense of violation and rage.

Basically, the story is of a peasant who is oppressed by landowners and his foremen while trying to eke out a living as a daily laborer. His comely wife, played by Smita Patil, is raped by the foreman who then has him arrested to hide his own crime. His wife commits suicide out of shame.

Soon after his father's death, the police bring him to the funeral grounds in manacles and shackles to complete the last rites of his dead father. Standing beside the burning funeral pyre, he sees the foreman looking at his pre-pubescent sister with lustful eyes. Divining the fate that is in store for her, he grabs an axe and chops off his sister's head to forestall her dire future as a perpetual victim, as he sees it. Upon completion of this hapless act of a desperate and downtrodden man, he raises his face towards the skies and screams, and screams and screams – the second time that we hear his voice in the movie (the first is in a flashback, as he vainly attempts to rescue his wife) — a device similar to Andrei Tarkovsky's showing of the icons in brilliant color at the end of his three-hour black-and-white film Andrei Rublev.

Cast
 Naseeruddin Shah as Bhaskar Kulkarni, Lawyer
 Om Puri as Lahanya Bhiku
 Smita Patil as Nagi Bhiku
 Amrish Puri as Dusane, Public Prosecutor
 Mohan Agashe as Bhonsle, chairman, Zilla Parishad
 Mahesh Elkunchwar as Social worker
 Nana Palsikar as Bhiku's father
 Achyut Potdar as More, forest contractor
 Deepak Shirke as ruffian
 Bhagyashree Kotnis as Bhiku's sister
 Reema Lagoo as lavni dancer
 Arvind Deshpande as Dr Vasant M. Patil

Songs
 "Kanha Re" - Vandana Khandekar - 7.33, Music : Ajit Varman, Lyrics : Vasant Deo
 "Sanson Mein Dard" - Madhuri Purandare - 5.44, Music: Ajit Varman, Lyrics: Suryabhanu Gupta
 "Tu Aisa Kaisa Mard" - Madhuri Purandare - 3.10, Music: Ajit Varman, Lyrics: Vasant Deo

Accolades

References

External links
 
 An insightful study of the film, Aakrosh
 A Movie Review

1980 films
1980 drama films
1980s Hindi-language films
Indian drama films
Films about social issues in India
Indian courtroom films
Films about Indian slavery
Films about women in India
Social realism in film
Indian crime films
Films about rape in India
Fictional portrayals of the Maharashtra Police
Films about corruption in India
Indian nonlinear narrative films
Films about the caste system in India
Films directed by Govind Nihalani
Films scored by Ajit Varman
Films with screenplays by Vijay Tendulkar
Best Hindi Feature Film National Film Award winners
1980 directorial debut films
Hindi-language drama films